Ezaias Terwesten (1661–1724) was an 18th-century painter from the Northern Netherlands.

Biography
Terwesten was born in The Hague.  According to Houbraken he was two years younger than his brother Augustinus Terwesten who was his first teacher, along with his brother Mattheus. He travelled to Rome, joined the Bentvueghels, and received the bent "Paradysvogel" (Bird of Paradise).

As well as Paradysvogel, he was also known by the pseudonym "Den Brander", and signed his Christian name Esayas, not Ezaias. He is often confused with a brother of the same name who was born 10 years before Terwesten's birth and who died early. He travelled to Rome in 1694 in the service of Prince-elector Frederick William, Elector of Brandenburg, got married, and remained there for the rest of his life.

References

Ezaias Terwesten on Artnet

External link

1661 births
1724 deaths
18th-century Dutch painters
18th-century Dutch male artists
Dutch male painters
Artists from The Hague
Members of the Bentvueghels